Easton Tower is a historic building located in the Arcola area of Paramus, New Jersey, and originally used as the housing for a water pump on the estate of businessman Edward D. Easton. It was built in 1899 and is located next to the Saddle River at the intersection of Red Mill & Paramus roads.

References

Industrial buildings completed in 1899
Buildings and structures in Bergen County, New Jersey
Paramus, New Jersey
New Jersey Register of Historic Places
1899 establishments in New Jersey